The International Journal of Software and Informatics is a quarterly peer-reviewed scientific journal of computer science. It was started by the Institute of Software of the Chinese Academy of Sciences. It covers the following topics: Artificial intelligence and pattern recognition, computer software, computer-aided applications, formal methods, multimedia techniques, theoretical computer science, network and information security, and related areas including quantum informatics, bioinformatics, neuroinformatics, and cognitive science.

The journal's editor in chief is Ruqian Lu (Institute of Mathematics, Academy of Mathematics and Systems Science, Chinese Academy of Sciences, China).

See also 
 Scientific publishing in China

External links 
 

Computer science journals
Science and technology in the People's Republic of China
Publications established in 2007
English-language journals